General elections were held in Paraguay on 6 February 1983. Alfredo Stroessner of the Colorado Party won the presidential elections, whilst the Colorado Party won 20 of the 30 seats in the Senate and 40 of the 60 seats in the Chamber of Deputues. Voter turnout was 92.6%.

Results

References

Paraguay
1983 in Paraguay
Elections in Paraguay
Presidential elections in Paraguay
Alfredo Stroessner
February 1983 events in South America